Two ships of the Royal Navy have been named HMS Londonderry, after the city of Londonderry in Northern Ireland.

  was a  sloop launched in 1935 and sold in 1948.
  was a  launched in 1958. She was a training ship between 1984 and 1988, and was expended as a target in June 1989 (After rocket hits, finally sunk by the long range gunfire of the German destroyer Rommel).

Royal Navy ship names